Rachel Martin is an American journalist for NPR. She previously co-hosted Morning Edition and was previously a producer and reporter for KQED in San Francisco.

Early life and education
Martin was born and raised in Idaho Falls, Idaho where she graduated from Idaho Falls High School. She graduated from University of Puget Sound in Tacoma, Washington with a bachelor's degree in politics and government in 1996, and from the School of International and Public Affairs at Columbia University in New York City with a master's degree in international affairs in 2003.

Career
Martin was a producer and reporter for KQED in San Francisco. In 2003, Martin was a freelance reporter in Afghanistan, also for NPR. From 2005 to 2007, she was foreign correspondent for NPR. In 2007, she covered the Virginia Tech shooting. In 2008, she was a correspondent for ABC News. In 2010, Martin was National Security Correspondent for NPR. She took over as host of Weekend Edition Sunday in 2012, shortly after longtime host Liane Hansen stepped down. She became a co-host of Morning Edition in 2016 when Renée Montagne stepped down. She left the show in early 2023.

References

External links

"The Dish Goes Indie; Al Jazeera Buys Current TV", Revolving Door Newsletter: 01.04.13 Media Bistro

Living people
Year of birth missing (living people)
University of Puget Sound alumni
People from Idaho Falls, Idaho
NPR personalities
School of International and Public Affairs, Columbia University alumni
American women television journalists
21st-century American women